Barbie as the Princess and the Pauper is a 2004 computer-animated musical fantasy film. It was released to video on September 28, 2004, and made its television premiere on Nickelodeon on November 14, 2004.

This film is the first musical in the Barbie series. It was directed by William Lau and stars the voice of Kelly Sheridan as the Barbie protagonists, Anneliese and Erika. The plot is loosely inspired by the 1881 Mark Twain novel The Prince and the Pauper, and it is the first Barbie film that completely excludes fantastic elements (fairies, magic, mermaids), which were a usual part of Barbie franchise. It is generally regarded as the best film in the franchise and has secured a strong cult following.

Songs for the film were written by Amy Powers, Megan Cavallari and Rob Hudnut, who also executive produced the film. The film was nominated for six DVD Exclusive Awards.

Plot
In an unnamed kingdom, a blonde princess and a brunette pauper are born at the same time. Several years later, Princess Anneliese (played by Barbie) is betrothed by her mother, Queen Genevieve, to the wealthy King Dominick (played by Ken) to save their nearly bankrupt royal treasury; however, Anneliese is in love with her young tutor Julian (played by Steven). The Pauper, Erika (played by Teresa) is an indentured servant, working off her parents' debt at Madame Carp's Dress Emporium, which supplies the palace with clothes; however, she dreams of becoming a singer and seeing the world.

Unbeknownst to the Queen, the reason behind the kingdom's bankruptcy is that her adviser Preminger has been stealing gold and emptying the royal mines. Upon learning from his henchmen, Nick and Nack, that the Queen has arranged Anneliese's marriage to King Dominick, he decides to make Anneliese 'mysteriously disappear'. Preminger plans to pretend that he has found the Princess, earning a betrothal to her, which would allow him to become king himself.

Julian takes Anneliese for a day out into the kingdom so that she can be free for once; there, she witnesses the poverty caused by the kingdom's bankruptcy. Anneliese hears Erika performing in the street to earn money but Madame Carp steals the earnings. Anneliese and Erika bond and learn that they are identical, apart from their hair color and the crown-shaped birthmark on Anneliese's shoulder. That night, Anneliese and her cat Serafina are abducted by Nick and Nack, who leave a forged letter saying she ran away.

Julian, doubting the letter, asks Erika to impersonate the Princess, saving the engagement while he investigates. Preminger is surprised when Erika, disguised as Anneliese, presents herself at the palace. Over time, Erika and King Dominick fall in love but Erika worries about what will happen if she is found out.

The real Anneliese escapes but the guards, having seen Erika, mistake Anneliese for an imposter. Mistaking Anneliese for Erika, Madame Carp forces Anneliese into her shop and locks her inside. Julian overhears Preminger's plans but is discovered and captured.

Anneliese has Serafina take her ring and a tag from the dress shop so someone can find her; unfortunately, Preminger and his dog Midas intercept her. Preminger takes Anneliese to the mines, where she is imprisoned with Julian after Nick and Nack cause a cave-in. Preminger returns to the palace, where he exposes Erika as a fake and has her imprisoned. Preminger convinces the Queen that Anneliese has died and that he has supposedly come into great wealth during his travels. With no other options, she reluctantly agrees to marry him to save the Kingdom.

Erika escapes the dungeon by singing a lullaby, causing the guard to fall asleep so she can take his keys. She is aided by King Dominick, who suspects Preminger of lying. Meanwhile, Anneliese and Julian find out how to restore the kingdom's resources with some geodes filled with crystals; the two then confess their love for each other. Erika's barking cat, Wolfie, unearths a mine shaft, and the group escapes by flooding the room and floating towards the surface in a barrel.

At the Queen and Preminger's wedding, Anneliese arrives, proves her identity with her birthmark, and reveals the truth about Preminger. After a brief chase, Preminger is arrested along with Nick and Nack. Anneliese tells her mother that she wants to marry Julian and that they can help save the kingdom. Soon after, the kingdom's prosperity is restored thanks to the crystals in the mine. Madame Carp is no longer patronized by the palace and goes out of business; with her debt finally paid, Erika leaves to become a renowned singer. After touring the world alone, Erika realizes where her heart truly lies and decides to return home to marry Dominick. Anneliese and Erika have a double wedding, and they and their husbands ride off in a carriage together.

Voice cast

Songs
Barbie as the Princess and the Pauper is the first musical in the series of Barbie CGI films. It features seven original songs written by Amy Powers and Megan Cavallari with an original score by Arnie Roth, performed by the London Symphonic Orchestra and the Czech Philharmonic Chamber Orchestra. The entire soundtrack (including popular duets and the opening orchestral theme) can be found on the "Barbie Sings! The Princess Movie Song Collection" CD, released by Mattel in 2004.

The songs in the film are, in chronological order, as follows.

"Free" – Julie Stevens (Erika) & Melissa Lyons (Anneliese)
"How Can I Refuse?" – Martin Short (Preminger)
"Written in Your Heart" (Prelude) – Julie Stevens (Erika)
"I Am a Girl Like You" – Julie Stevens (Erika) & Melissa Lyons (Anneliese)
"To Be a Princess" – Alessandro Juliani (Julian) & Julie Stevens (Erika) 
"The Cat's Meow" – Julie Stevens (Erika)
"If You Love Me for Me" – Julie Stevens (Erika) & Mark Luna (Dominick)
"How Can You Refuse?" (Reprise) – Martin Short (Preminger)
"Written in Your Heart" (Finale) – Julie Stevens (Erika) & Melissa Lyons (Anneliese)
"I'm on My Way" – Sara Niemietz

Release
The DVD and VHS was released on September 28, 2004, and distributed by Lionsgate Home Entertainment. The film was re-released on January 5, 2010, by Universal Pictures Home Entertainment. The DVD also included a CD containing seven songs from the film soundtrack.

Reception

Critical response
Barbie as the Princess and the Pauper received generally positive reviews from entertainment critics. Steve Evans of DVD Verdict called it "wholesome entertainment" with "sweet songs tunefully sung" though lacking in grown-up humor. D. Liebenson of The Video Librarian praised Barbie's "virtuoso performance", and wrote, "If not altogether faithful to the source material, this impressive production is still a class act, and another jewel in Barbie's crown." Reviewing the film for the South China Morning Post, Karmel Schreyer noted a "a girl-power twist" on the original Mark Twain tale, and wrote that "the story includes all the elements that make it a worthwhile watch: duty, responsibility, compassion, free will – and, of course, a love interest." Describing the story as "a fascinatingly nuanced line between following one's heart [...] and doing one's duty", Brendan Howard of Video Store praised the film's animation, music and voice talent as "top-notch", but was disappointed with the DVD extras, which he called "essentially a serving of karaoke and commercials".

James Lileks of the Star Tribune wrote favourably of the film's "hummable tunes with clever lyrics, fine characters and a scathing indictment of the inequities of the feudal system" and jokingly dubbed it "the "Citizen Kane" of the [children's film] genre" due to its unusually high quality. Mandi Bierly of Entertainment Weekly scored it a B+, noting a generally "feminist" story.  TV Guide's Robert Pardi scored it 2.5/4, praising the "peppy score" and classic story as distinguishing an otherwise "ordinary Mattel-icized version of the classic tale".

Reviewing the film for Common Sense Media, Tracy Moore found the animation quality was improved from previous CGI Barbie films, and advised that parents "may appreciate attention drawn to class inequality, and the precious few scenes focusing on girls liking science, books, and less passive pursuits." Moore wrote that the film "almost succeed[s]" in updating traditional models for girls' entertainment, as Princess Anneliese and Erika are shown "putting [their interests] first over romance [...] But the big finish still centers around them pairing off, fairy-tale style." In The Dallas Morning News, Nancy Churnin praised the lead characters as "bold and brainy" and found, "one of the sweetest aspects of this film is the utter absence of jealousy between Anneliese and Erika. Good things happen, ultimately, because of their mutual friendship and support."

Awards

Video game
A video game for Game Boy Advance, PC, and Macintosh was released in 2004 by Vivendi Universal Games. In the Game Boy Advance title, the plot follows that of the movie: players must thwart Preminger's attempt to take over the kingdom by marrying Anneliese. Players control four characters: Anneliese, Erika, Serafina, and Wolfie.

References

External links
Barbie as the Princess and the Pauper at the Universal Pictures Home Entertainment portal

2004 direct-to-video films
2004 computer-animated films
2000s American animated films
2000s musical fantasy films
Barbie films
2000s children's animated films
2000s English-language films
Films about princesses
Films based on The Prince and the Pauper
Game Boy Advance games
Lionsgate films
Lionsgate animated films
American children's animated fantasy films
American direct-to-video films
American children's animated musical films
Canadian direct-to-video films
Canadian independent films
Canadian animated feature films
Animated films based on novels
2000s children's fantasy films
American musical fantasy films
Canadian musical fantasy films
Animated films set in England
Films set in palaces
Films directed by William Lau
2000s Canadian films
Windows games